The Right Reverend Francis Balfour (b Sorrento 21 June 1846; d Mafeteng 3 February 1924) was Assistant Bishop of Bloemfontein from 1910 until his death.

Balfour was educated at Harrow; Trinity College, Cambridge; and Cuddesdon. He was ordained deacon in 1872, and priest in 1874. After a curacy in Buckingham he went out as a missionary, firstly to Basutoland and then to Mashonaland. He was Archdeacon of Bloemfontein from 1901 until 1906; and of Basutoland from 1907 to 1922.

References

1860 births
People from Sorrento
People educated at Harrow School
Archdeacons of Bloemfontein
Archdeacons of Basutoland
Alumni of Trinity College, Cambridge
20th-century Anglican Church of Southern Africa bishops
Anglican bishops of Bloemfontein
1924 deaths
Francis